Soonchunhyang University (SCH) is a private university in Asan, South Korea.

SCH was founded by Dr. Succ-Jo Suh in 1978 as a medical college with 80 students.  It expanded to  a comprehensive university in 1980, offering both undergraduate and graduate programs. SCH was  ranked 151st among Asia-Pacific universities by Chosun-QS Asia in 2010.

History and description
SCH has six undergraduate colleges: Humanities, Social Sciences, Natural Sciences, Engineering, Medical Science and Medicine. There are six graduate schools: the Graduate School, Graduate School of Industrial Information, Graduate School of Education, Graduate of Health Science, Graduate School of Public Administration, and Graduate School of Global Management.

The name ‘Soonchunhyang’ (순천향) means ‘the peaceful hometown complying with the will of heaven’. The university's founder, Dr. Succ-Jo Suh named the school to reflect his philosophy in medical practices that "heaven will cure diseases; doctors only help the curing process."

SCH received the 'National Award for Educational Reform Excellence' from the Korean Ministry of Education, Science and Technology in 2008, 2009, and 2010.

In 2017, the University was under scrutiny for their ties to ex-president Park Geun-hye during the court proceedings during the Impeachment of Park Geun-hye. The University President, Gyo-il Seo, allegedly received bribes for development from the President's office and Department of Education while university doctors prescribed President Park with illegal sleep medicines. Soonchunhyang University’s support from the Ministry of Education increased from 7 billion won in 2012 and 4.5 billion won in 2013 to 8.1 billion won in 2014, 9.2 billion won in 2015, and 23.5 billion won in 2016 when the Park Geun-hye administration took office. This caused the University to lose public funding when Moon Jae-in was inaugurated, in turn causing the University to downscale and close its Department of Education.

Academics

Undergraduate colleges 
College of Humanities
College of Social Sciences
College of Natural Sciences
College of Engineering
College of Medical Science
College of Medicine'
Global Business School

Graduate school 

 Graduate School of Industrial Information
 Graduate School of Education
 Graduate of Healthcare Science
 Graduate School of Public Administration
 Graduate School of Global Management

Graduate School of Forensic Science 
The School was established to educate students theoretical and application methods of scientific crime investigation. The graduate program focuses on the application of the physical, bio-medical, and social sciences to the analysis and evaluation of physical evidence, human testimony and criminal suspects. As of 2014 the Graduate School of Forensic Science established a Master's program in Digital Forensic Science.

Recent developments 
In June 2009, SCH was awarded a grant of US$25 million over a five-year period by the Ministry of Education, Science and Technology to establish the SCH Biopharmaceutical Human Resources Development Center. This new center supports several of SCH's major areas of study, including:

College of medical Sciences 
 Department of Medical IT Engineering
 Department of Medical Biotechnology
 Department of Biomedical Laboratory Science
 Department of U-Healthcare Management
 Department of Premedical Studies
 Department of Occupational Therapy
 Department of Pharmaceutical Engineering

College of medicine 
 Department of Nursing
 Department of Medicine

College of natural sciences 
 Department of Life Sciences
 Department of Biotechnology
 Department of Ocean Life Science
 Department of Chemistry
 Department of Food Science & Nutrition
 Department of Environmental Health Science

Ranking 

SCH ranked 151st for general education among Asia-Pacific universities by Chosun-QS Asia in 2010 
SCH ranked 8th for general education environment and for communication with students by Kyunhyang ERISS in 2010 
SCH ranked 135th for general education among Asia-Pacific universities by Chosun-QS Asia in 2009

Transportation 
SCH offered shuttle bus service  from Seoul and various cities in Gyeonggi Province and Incheon. This was shut down after campus renovations and remodeling removed the campus bus station in early 2021.

SCH maintains a lending library for the local public within Sinchang-Soonchunhyang University Station. Books and periodicals range from academic texts to novels to general interest periodicals.

SCH undertook an educational initiative for its students commuting to campus by subway in Fall 2010, offering lectures in three university courses by SCH professors. The car of the train where the lectures are held is equipped with four LCD monitors, a beam projector, speakers, and a wireless microphone for the professors.

University hospitals 

SCU owns and operates four teaching hospitals in South Korea. These are general hospitals offering services in several departments such as Pediatric Neurology, Psychology, and Cardiovascular Surgery

Global network 
Soonchunhyang University maintains formal educational partnerships with 88 post-secondary institutions worldwide. These partner institutions are found in the US, China, Finland, Australia, Japan, Mexico, Cambodia, Thailand and several other countries.

Global village 
The SCH Global Village on Soonchunhyang's is a living facility for Korean and international students . As a concept, the Global Village is intended to bridge the formal educational and social needs of students participating in the Asian Studies, English Village, Chinese Village, and Japanese Village programs.

The School for Global Education and Exchange also maintains a separate student lounge where students may keep up on global events through Korean and English cable television, English- and Korean-language print news media, and PC terminals equipped with high-speed internet access.

Confucius Institute 
The Confucius Institute at SCU was established on September 28, 2007 in affiliation with the Tianjin Foreign Studies University in China, with a mandate to promote Chinese language education and cultural learning . Programs include Chinese language education classes, Chinese youth camp, and cultural field trips to China.

As of June 15, 2010, the Confucius Institute at SCH and the local government of Asan City began to offer programs for Asan's youth through the Asan City Youth Education and Culture Center (link to reference).

In 2008 and 2009, The Confucius Institute  was rated first in Korea and third in the world for overall achievement by Confucius Institute headquarters.

Asian Studies 
The Asian Studies Program is a special university program that brings students from several countries to SCH for one-three semesters. The program includes approximately 50 courses conducted in English, such as Korean Studies, Asian culture classes, history, politics, economics, and Korean Language..

English, Chinese, and Japanese Village Programs
The English Village, Chinese Village, and Japanese Village programs complement the Asian Studies Program by aiming to focus on the global-oriented educational needs of SCH's local Korean students. Students wishing to practice English, Chinese, or Japanese with native speakers live together with international students participating in the Asian Studies program and cooperate in language exchanges, group meetings, field trips, and other various events.

University clubs 

 Hansori performs ‘samulnori’,  About 50 members practice every week for playing regular and temporary performance.
 Since 1981, the Byuk theater group performs two regular plays a year, and casual play sometimes.
 Since 1985, the Korean Traditional Percussion Group has explored Korean musical traditions. Currently, there are 50 members to this club, including 34 undergraduate students.
 The Thu.G club meets regularly to practice rapping and beat box skills. The club holds four main performances throughout the school year.
 The Sun C.A Cheerleading Squad meets weekly to practice dances and movement for cheerleading. With 38 members (30 of whom are undergraduates
 DENIS (Dance Energy Nation In Soonchunhyang) practices street dance
 CHORD is one of Soonchunhyang's longest-standing clubs. Established in 1986, this club currently maintains 200 members (including 50 undergraduate students), who regularly perform at events such as the annual regular and open concerts, mini concerts for new students, SCH Music Festival, and periodic field trips. This club won first place in the KBS TV Academic Music Festival in 1988, and took second place in the same festival in 1991. In 2006, CHORD won first place in the Korean Amateur Music Festival.
 M. Giuliani, or Classical Guitar Circle, currently has 99 members, 40 of whom are undergraduate students. This club offers guitar lessons to its members and participates in mini concerts and regular concerts annually.
 Soongumhoi is the campus fencing club, with 150 members (30 of whom are undergraduate students). T
 The Tae Kwon Do club was established in 1992 with 20 members, and has expanded to 60 members (including 37 undergraduate students). 
 The Calligraphy Group was founded  in 1978. Currently, 38 members (30 of whom are undergraduate students). During regular meetings, members practice Korean-style calligraphy (called soye) .

Notable alumni
 Jeon No-min, actor

References

External links
 Soonchunhyang University

Universities and colleges in South Chungcheong Province
Educational institutions established in 1978
Asan
Private universities and colleges in South Korea